The 2009 Independence Cup was the inaugural men's association football friendly tournament organised by the Albanian Football Association on 28 November to commemorate Albanian Independence Day. Flamurtari of Albania, Shkëndija of Republic of Macedonia and Prishtina of Kosovo were invited to compete in the tournament, which was held at the Flamurtari Stadium in Vlorë, near the site of the Albanian Declaration of Independence on 28 November 1912.

Matches lasted 45 minutes each and the competition followed a point scoring system, whereby each team plays two matches, with three points awarded for a win, none for a loss with penalty shootouts determining the winners of drawn matches. All three matches finished in goalless draws and were all decided through penalty shootouts, with Flamurtari winning the tournament after defeating Shkëndija and Prishtina 11–10 and 3–2 on penalties, respectively.

Standings

Matches

References

External links 

Emirates Cup News

2009–10 in Albanian football